
OGLE-TR-182 is a dim magnitude 17 star far off in the constellation Carina at a distance of approximately 12,700 light years.

Planetary system
This star is home to the transiting extrasolar planet OGLE-TR-182b discovered in October 2007.

See also 
 List of extrasolar planets
 Optical Gravitational Lensing Experiment OGLE

References

External links
 

G-type main-sequence stars
Planetary transit variables
Carina (constellation)
Planetary systems with one confirmed planet